Starotazlarovo (İśke Taźlar) is a rural locality (a village) in Tazlarovsky Selsoviet, Burayevsky District, Bashkortostan, Russia. The population was 221 as of 2010. There are five streets.

Geography 
Starotazlarovo is located 18 km east of Burayevo (the district's administrative centre) by road. Kasiyarovo is the nearest rural locality.

References 

Rural localities in Burayevsky District